Top-seeded foreign player Betty Nuthall defeated Anna Harper 6–1, 6–4 in the final to win the women's singles tennis title at the 1930 U.S. National Championships which was held between August 18 and 23, 1930. The final lasted 36 minutes and was watched by 3,500 spectators. The reigning champion Helen Wills Moody did not participate to defend her title.

Seeds
The tournament used two lists of players for seeding the women's singles event; one list of eight U.S. players and one for foreign players which contained two players. Betty Nuthall is the champion; others show in brackets the round in which they were eliminated.

  Marjorie Morrill (semifinals)
  Anna Harper (finalist)
  Eleanor Goss (second round)
  Sarah Palfrey (third round)
  Ethel Burkhardt (quarterfinals)
  Mary Greef (quarterfinals)
  Edith Cross (third round)
  Josephine Cruickshank (third round)
  Betty Nuthall (champion)
  Maud Levi (semifinals)

Draw

Final eight

References

1930
1930 in women's tennis
1930 in American women's sports
Wom